Sarwar Ahuja is a Bollywood actor . He was the male winner of the first season of the talent show India's Best Cinestars Ki Khoj in 2004.

Ahuja is from Hyderabad. He has worked on television, in programs such as Jyoti where he played the part of Sachin and Pankaj. He plays Inspector Shaurya in the TV series Hum Ne Li Hai Shapath, a crime drama series set in Mumbai. He is married to TV actress Aditi Sharma.

Filmography

Television
Hum Ne Li Hai... Shapath – Inspector Shaurya
Punar Vivah – Prashant Satyendra Dubey
Keshav Pandit – Keshav Pandit/Madhav Shastri 
Jyoti – Pankaj 
Adaalat – Cameo 
Yeh Hai Aashiqui – Danish in Episode 18
 Diya Aur Baati Hum – Satyadev Tripathi
 Gangaa – Palash Banerjee
 Mere Papa Hero Hiralal – Hiralal tiwari
 Mose Chhal Kiye Jaaye - Goldie Seghal; Armaan's childhood friend and a Punjabi lawyer

Films
 Khanna & Iyer 2007
 Hum Phirr Milein na Milein 2008
 Meri Padosan 2008
 Patiala Dreamz (Punjabi 2014)

References

Living people
Indian male film actors
1979 births
Indian male television actors